Viktoriya Shkoda (born December 21, 1999 in Krasnodar) is a Russian footballer who plays as a defender for Kubanochka Krasnodar at the Russian Women's Football Championship.

Shkoda played for Russian U17 and U19 teams. On 29 June 2017, she was included by coach Elena Fomina in the 23-players squad that represented Russia at the UEFA Women's Euro 2017, although she didn't play any of the team's matches in the competition. She played her first match for the national team July 7, 2017 in a friendly against Croatia.

References

External links
 
 
 
 Profile at Russian Football Union

1999 births
Living people
Russia women's international footballers
Russian women's footballers
Women's association football defenders
Russian Women's Football Championship players
Universiade medalists in football
Universiade bronze medalists for Russia
Kubanochka Krasnodar players
Medalists at the 2019 Summer Universiade
UEFA Women's Euro 2017 players